David Christiani (25 December 1610 – 13 February 1688) was a German mathematician, philosopher and Lutheran theologian. He became an ordinary professor of mathematics at the University of Marburg in 1643, ordinary professor of theology at the University of Giessen in 1681, and rector of the University of Giessen in 1686.

References

1610 births
1688 deaths
People from Gryfice
People from Pomerania
17th-century German mathematicians
German philosophers
German Lutheran theologians
17th-century German Protestant theologians
17th-century philosophers
German male non-fiction writers
17th-century German writers
17th-century German male writers